Eremopedes scudderi is a species of shield-backed katydid in the Eremopedes genus, Orthoptera order, Tettigoniidae family, and insecta class. It is found in North America.

References

Tettigoniinae
Articles created by Qbugbot
Insects described in 1898
Orthoptera of North America